Paolo Raffaelli (born 1 August 1953) is an Italian politician and journalist.

He is member of the Democratic Party. He served as mayor of Terni from 1999 to 2009.

He started professional journalism in 1988.

He was elected at the Senate of the Republic from 1994 to 1999 for two legislatures (XII, XIII).

He was also president of National Association of Italian Municipalities Umbria from 2007 to 2009. He resigned from the Chamber in September 1999.

He returned to work as a journalist in the editorial staff of the RAI regional TG for Umbria.

Biography
Paolo Raffaelli was born in Terni, Italy in 1953. He is married and has one son. He completed university studies in economics and political science.

See also
 List of mayors of Terni

References 

1953 births
Living people
People from Terni
Democratic Party (Italy) politicians
20th-century Italian politicians
21st-century Italian politicians
Italian journalists
Mayors of Terni
Members of the Italian Senate